Broken is the second full-length studio album from hardcore punk  band, Straight Faced. It was released in July, 1996 on Fearless Records and follows Guilty released in 1995. The album was produced by Strung Out bassist Jim Cherry.

Track listing

Personnel
Straight Faced
 Johnny Miller – vocals
 Kevin Grossman – guitar
 Damon Beard – guitar
 Sam Marrs – bass
 Ron Moeller – drums
Production
 Recorded at Paramount Recording Studios, Hollywood, California, USA
 Produced by Jim Cherry
 Mixed by Ryan Greene at Fat Planet
 Mastered by Eddie Schreyer

References

External links
Fearless Records album page

Fearless Records albums
1996 albums
Straight Faced albums